David Kurtz is an American film score composer who has won Daytime Emmy Awards for his work on The Bold and the Beautiful and The Young and the Restless.  he was a member of the Yale School of Music Board of Visitors. He is a member of ASCAP.

Awards
Daytime Emmys
(With Jack Allocco, 2013)
Outstanding Achievement In Music Direction and Composition for a Drama Series
Outstanding Original Song for a Drama Series

Credits
The Woman Who Sinned (1991)
The Bold and the Beautiful (1987–2015)
The Young and the Restless (1984–2014)
By the Sea (2002)
Alien Nation (1994–96)
Charles in Charge (1987–1988)
The Big Chill (1983)
Instant Justice (1986)
Hunk (1987)

References

External links
 

American television composers
Living people
Year of birth missing (living people)